The Izegem Tribes are a Belgian American football team based in Izegem. The Tribes are members of the Flemish American Football League (FAFL) conference in the Belgian Football League (BFL). Their team colours are maroon, white and black.

History

The team is the continuation of the former West Flanders Tribes which split up into the Ostend Pirates and the Izegem Tribes.

2013 season

2014 season

2015 season

References

American football teams in Belgium
1989 establishments in Belgium
American football teams established in 1989